Biskupski (feminine: Biskupska; plural: Biskupscy) is a Polish-language surname, derived from biskup meaning "bishop". It may refer to:
 Eugeniusz Biskupski (1947-2010), Polish athlete
 Jackie Biskupski (born 1966), American politician
 Mieczysław B. Biskupski, Polish-American historian

See also
 Vasili Biskupsky, Russian general

Polish-language surnames
Occupational surnames